The 2012 NASCAR Nationwide Series was the thirty-first season of semi-professional stock car racing in the United States. The season included thirty-three races, down from thirty-four, and began with the DRIVE4COPD 300 at Daytona International Speedway and ended with the Ford EcoBoost 300 at Homestead-Miami Speedway. Chevrolet won the Manufacturer's Championship. Joe Gibbs won the Owners' Championship with the No. 18 car, while Ricky Stenhouse Jr. of Roush Fenway Racing won the Drivers' championship with a sixth-place finish at the final race of the season.

Teams and drivers

Complete schedule

Limited schedule

Team changes
Discontinued/Suspended operations
Kevin Harvick closed his team and transferred its cars, crew, and points over to Richard Childress Racing.
Unable to secure a sponsor for the #66 Toyota driven by Steven Wallace, Rusty Wallace announced on January 6 that his Nationwide Series team Rusty Wallace Racing would be placed on hiatus and had released driver Michael Annett.
After running a partial schedule in 2011, Team Rensi Motorsports moved to the K&N Pro Series East with development driver Mark Ballas.

Started operations
Tommy Baldwin Racing returns to the Nationwide Series, fielding a #36 Chevrolet in 6 events for Sprint Cup driver Dave Blaney's son, Ryan Blaney, as well as one race appearances by K&N East Series champion Ryan Truex and Modified driver Bobby Santos III.
Kyle Busch Motorsports announced on January 19 that driving duties would be split between Kyle Busch and his brother Kurt. Notably, Kyle ran in the Nationwide Series only for KBM, and drove 22 races while Kurt drove the other 11.

Driver changes
Driver changes
Danica Patrick raced full-time in 2012 driving the No. 7 Chevrolet for JR Motorsports after running a part-time schedule in 2010 and 2011.
Tayler Malsam raced full-time in 2012 driving the No. 19 Toyota for TriStar Motorsports, replacing Mike Bliss.
2011 ROTY runner-up Blake Koch moved to Rick Ware Racing, replacing Carl Long who drove the car for most of 2011. However, his sponsorship dried up after ESPN denied them ad time, and Koch left RWR.
Kasey Kahne and USAC driver Brad Sweet split the driving duties of the No. 38 Chevrolet for Turner Motorsports. Sweet contested Rookie of the Year and ran 18 races while Kahne ran the other 15.
After fielding the #39 Ford for multiple drivers in 2011, Go Green Racing announced on January 6 that Joey Gase would drive the team's #39 entry full-time and compete for Sunoco Rookie of the Year.
After the shutdown of Rusty Wallace Racing, Michael Annett teamed up with Richard Petty Motorsports to run the #43 Ford full-time.

Entering the series
Travis Pastrana was to make his NASCAR debut with Pastrana-Waltrip Racing, running 7 races in 2011, beginning at Indianapolis. However, due to injuries he sustained at X Games XVII, his debut was delayed until Richmond in April 2012.
Austin Dillon moved up to the Nationwide Series to run for Rookie of The Year honors in 2012. Dillon drove a No. 3 Chevrolet for Richard Childress Racing.
Cole Whitt was announced as the driver of the No. 88 Chevrolet for JR Motorsports on January 4, replacing Aric Almirola who moved up to the Sprint Cup Series with Richard Petty Motorsports.
Johanna Long announced her move up to the Nationwide Series with ML Motorsports, driving their #70 Chevrolet for 22 races to compete for Rookie of the Year honors.
On January 9, Phoenix Racing announced that its driver in the Nationwide Series, as in the Sprint Cup Series, would be Kurt Busch, who completed in Nationwide part-time.
Ryan Blaney, son of Sprint Cup driver Dave Blaney, ran a limited schedule in the Nationwide Series, driving the team's No. 36 for 6 races.
Former K&N West Series Champion Jason Bowles ran for Rookie of the Year with MacDonald Motorsports.

Changed teams
Exiting the series
Aric Almirola left the series to drive in the # 43 RPM Sprint Cup Series full-time.

2012 calendar

Calendar changes

The Richmond 250 was moved to the weekend before the Aaron's 312.
The Pioneer Hi-Bred 250 and History 300 were moved to precede the 5-hour Energy 200.
The Indianapolis weekend race, originally held at Lucas Oil Raceway, was moved to the Indianapolis Motor Speedway as part of "Super Weekend at the Brickyard."
The Feed The Children 300 was moved to precede the Subway Jalapeño 250.
Dover Motorsports removed both races from the Nashville Superspeedway.
The Dollar General 300 was moved to precede the Kansas Lottery 300.
Kentucky Speedway removed the IndyCar race from its schedule and replaced it with a second Nationwide race: a 300-mile event in September. The Truck undercard race continued.

Season summary
The Nationwide Series started its 2012 season at Daytona. The race was dominated by a mix of tandem and pack drafting. On the final lap, Kurt and Kyle Busch attempted to block the tandem of Joey Logano and Trevor Bayne. When the Busch brothers moved up to block, it resulted in a 10 car collision that wrecked most of the top 10. Part-time Nationwide driver James Buescher sailed through the wreck and scored his first series win. Heading to Phoenix, Kevin Harvick dominated the race, leading 90 laps. On the final pitstop, teammate Sadler got two tires and managed to hold off a charging Brad Keselowski for his first Nationwide win in 14 years. Heading to Las Vegas, defending champion Ricky Stenhouse Jr. held off veteran Mark Martin for his first win of the season. The next week at Bristol, polesitter Logano dominated the race, leading 119 laps. But Elliott Sadler, on the advice of crew chief Luke Lambert, stayed out during the final round of pit stops and held off Kasey Kahne for his second win in four races. In California, Logano won back-to-back poles, but held off Stenhouse for his first win of the season.

Following the off week, teams returned to racing at Texas. There, Stenhouse and Paul Menard were the class of the field, with Menard leading 100 laps. However, Stenhouse rallied from a poor early pitstop and held off Menard for his second win of the season. At Richmond, Harvick, Kurt Busch, and Virginia native Denny Hamlin dominated the race, but Busch would hold off Hamlin to take the first Nationwide win for Kyle Busch Motorsports. The following week at Talladega, a multi-car crash on the last lap forced a red flag. On the restart, Joey Logano edged Cup teammate Kyle Busch by 0.034 seconds to take his second win of the year. At Darlington, Hamlin dominated the race, leading 102 laps. However, a push from Keselowski on a green-white-checkered restart sent Logano to the lead and to his second consecutive win. At Iowa, points leader Stenhouse once again dominated, leading 209 of 250 laps to easily claim his third consecutive Iowa win. At Charlotte, Keselowski stayed out during the final round of pit stops, going 73 laps on a single tank of fuel to claim his first win of the season. At Dover, Logano dominated the race and held off teammates Ryan Truex and Brian Scott to grab the win.

Following the second off weekend, the series returned to action at Michigan, where Logano once again dominated the race, holding off Buescher to grab his second consecutive victory. The following week at Road America, Nelson Piquet Jr. dominated the race from pole, grabbing his first Nationwide win and becoming the first Brazilian to win in one of NASCAR's top three divisions. At Kentucky, Austin Dillon dominated the race, easily holding off the field to take his first career Nationwide win and becoming the first rookie winner since Juan Pablo Montoya. Dillon took over the points lead, but lost it after failing post-race inspection. When the series returned to Daytona, multiple Big Ones took out most of the contenders. However, Kurt Busch stayed out front and pulled a last lap pass on Joey Logano to take his second win of the season. The series headed to Chicago, where Stenhouse dominated most of the day, but a decision to stay out when the leaders pitted on lap 130 cost him later. On lap 166, Stenhouse pitted, handing the lead to points leader Sadler. Sadler managed to hold off both Stenhouse and Illinois native Justin Allgaier on a green-white-checkered to take his third win of the season and win the Nationwide Dash 4 Cash bonus.

The series made its inaugural trip to the Brickyard, where points leader Sadler led after Kyle Busch was involved in a late wreck. However, NASCAR officials penalized Sadler for allegedly jumping the final restart, sending him back to 16th. Cup regular Keselowski took the lead and held off teammate Sam Hornish Jr. to give owner Roger Penske his first stock car win at Indy. At the second race in Iowa, polesitter Elliott Sadler rebounded from the disappointment at Indy and held off Justin Allgaier to grab his fourth win of the season. Heading up north to Watkins Glen, Keselowski dominated the race, but Carl Edwards, making a one-off appearance, passed Keselowski with 10 to go and held on for his first win of the season. The series headed north of the border for its final road course race at Montreal. Jacques Villeneuve dominated the race, but was forced to conserve fuel over two green-white-checkered finishes. On the second attempt, Justin Allgaier pulled a bump and run on Villeneuve on the final lap to take his first win of the year.

Action resumed at the newly reconfigured Bristol. Harvick led the race for 98 laps, seeking the No. 33 team's first win of the year. However, he ran out of fuel during a caution on lap 238, handing the lead to Joey Logano. Logano would then hold off Stenhouse for the victory. At Atlanta, Harvick dominated the race, leading 157 laps. However, a late caution for a crash by Mike Bliss, Buescher, and Kyle Fowler bunched up the field. On the ensuing restart, Stenhouse made a last lap pass on Harvick to take the win. The following week at Richmond, Harvick would make up for the losses and dominated the race, leading 141 laps en route to his first win of the season. Returning to Chicagoland, Stenhouse rallied from an incorrect adjustment on the final pit stop to pass Kyle Busch with 20 to go to take his fifth win of the season as well as the points lead. At Kentucky, polesitter Austin Dillon took advantage of a fast final pitstop to get in front of the field, holding off Hornish to sweep the Kentucky races and put himself back in the championship hunt.

The series returned to Dover, where Logano once again dominated the race, leading 184 of 200 laps en route to his 7th win of the year and the season sweep at the "Monster Mile". Returning to Charlotte, the race was dominated by Cup regulars Keselowski, Logano, and Harvick. The final 30 laps were a fuel mileage race, where Logano, who pitted with 14 to go, retook the lead with 6 to go, rolling to his series high 8th win of the season. At a repaved Kansas, Stenhouse rallied from 2 laps down as well as mid-race contact with Logano to beat Kyle Busch on a green-white-checkered restart to grab his sixth win of the year. At the penultimate race in Phoenix, Logano dominated the race, holding off teammate Brian Vickers on a green-white-checkered finish to score his 9th win of the season while Stenhouse extended his points lead after Sadler crashed late in the race. At the season finale at Homestead, Regan Smith held off a dominant Kyle Busch to score his first Nationwide victory, while Stenhouse finished off his Nationwide Series career with a 6th-place finish and a second consecutive Championship.

Results and standings

Races

Drivers' standings

(key) Bold - Pole position awarded by time. Italics - Pole position set by final practice results or rainout. * – Most laps led.

1 – Post entry, driver and owner did not score points.
2 – Timmy Hill was originally registered for Sprint Cup points, but switched to Nationwide at Texas.
3 – Ricky Stenhouse Jr. was awarded the pole after Austin Dillon failed inspection.
4 – Chris Cook was originally registered for Sprint Cup points, but switched to Nationwide at Montreal.
5 – Ryan Blaney was originally registered for Nationwide points, but switched to the Trucks at Atlanta.

Manufacturer

See also
 2012 NASCAR Sprint Cup Series
 2012 NASCAR Camping World Truck Series
 2012 NASCAR K&N Pro Series East
 2012 ARCA Racing Series
 2012 NASCAR Canadian Tire Series
 2012 NASCAR Toyota Series
 2012 NASCAR Stock V6 Series
 2012 Racecar Euro Series

References

NASCAR Xfinity Series seasons